Brian Michael Vallée (1940–2011) was a Canadian author, journalist, documentary film producer, screenwriter, and public speaker. He is best known for his work reflecting on domestic violence and his role with CBC's award-winning documentary program The Fifth Estate.  His first non-fiction book, Life With Billy focused on the life of Jane Hurshman, an abused wife whose legal case resulted in battered wife syndrome becoming a legal defense in Canadian courts.

Life and career
Brian Michael Vallée was born in Sault Ste. Marie, Ontario, in 1940. In 1967 he graduated from Michigan State University with a B.A. in journalism. In 1970 he began work as a reporter for the Windsor Star.  In 1974 he moved to Toronto and began working at the Toronto Sun where he was employed for 14 months.  As a journalist he worked on newspapers in England, the United States, and Canada. In 1978 he went on to work for ten years with the CBC's documentary program the fifth estate.  He died on July 22, 2011 in St. Michael's Hospital, Toronto.

Awards and honours
Vallée's work has received considerable critical acclaim. A television movie based on his Life With Billy book won three Gemini Awards in 1995. Two of his CBC documentaries won ACTRA Awards for the fifth estate and he was an associate producer for the one-hour documentary Cruel Camera, which won an Audubon Society award. In 2012 he was inducted into the Sault Ste Marie, Ontario Walk of Fame.

Advocacy
Brian Vallée was a long time advocate for awareness around domestic violence.  Some of his most notable works including Life with Billy, Life After Billy, and The War on Women all focus on bringing the issue of domestic abuse and battered women to the forefront of Canadian consciousness. Many of Vallée's speaking engagements, conference talks, and documentary projects focused on battered women and the need for increased public awareness about the lives of women living with abuse.

Works

Literary
 Life With Billy (1986) 
 Un Femme en Enfer (1986) 
 Pariah (1991) 
 Life After Billy (1995) 
 Edwin Alonzo Boyd: The Story of the Notorious Boyd Gang (1997) 
 The Torso Murder: The Untold Story of Evelyn Dick (2001) 
 The War on Women (book) (2007)

Television and Film
 Just Another Missing Kid Associate producer (1982, went on to win an Academy Award) 
 Life with Billy Writer (1994 Canadian television film, winner of three Gemini Awards)
 Behind the Mask series (1998 Life and Times (TV series) documentary on artist Ken Danby)
 Unmaking the Myth: The Life and Times of Edwin Alonzo Boyd (2002)
 The Notorious Mrs. Dick Writer and researcher (2002 TV documentary)
 Prince of Pot: The U.S. vs. Marc Emery Researcher (2007)

References

External links
 Official Website
 Brian Vallée archival fonds

1940 births
2011 deaths
Canadian male non-fiction writers
Michigan State University alumni
Canadian non-fiction writers
Canadian male journalists
Canadian newspaper journalists
CBC Television people
People from Sault Ste. Marie, Ontario
Writers from Ontario